Földvár means hillfort in Hungarian. It may refer to:

Hungary
 Balatonföldvár, a town in Somogy County
 Dunaföldvár, a town in Tolna County
 Pusztaföldvár, a village in Békés County
 Százhalombatta-Földvár, a Bronze-Age archaeological site
 Tiszaföldvár, a town in Jász-Nagykun-Szolnok County
 Abbey Földvár, founding site for the village of Németkér in Tolna County

Romania
 Székelyföldvár, Hungarian name for Războieni-Cetate, a village   in the municipality of Ocna Mureș (Marosújvár) in Alba County
 Melegföldvár, Hungarian name for Feldioara, a village in the commune of Cătina in Cluj County
 Barcaföldvár, Hungarian name for Feldioara, a commune in Brașov County

Serbia
 Bácsföldvár, Hungarian name for Bačko Gradište, a village in Vojvodina

Other uses
 Battle of Földvár, a battle that took place after the Battle of Szina in the Kingdom of Hungary